Armbrister is a surname. Notable people with the surname include:

Cache Armbrister (born 1989), Bahamian sprinter of Jamaican descent
Ed Armbrister (1948–2021), Bahamian baseball player
Ken Armbrister (born 1946), American politician
Thurston Armbrister (born 1992), American football player